Howard J Stoddard (1901–1971) was a prominent banker in Michigan.  He founded Michigan National Bank by merging several banks in mid-sized Michigan cities.

Biography 

Stoddard was born in Baker City, Oregon.  His father was George E. Stoddard, a business partner of David Eccles.  Eccles' wife was Ellen E. Stoddard, a sister of George Stoddard.  Thus Howard Stoddard was the cousin of Marriner S. Eccles.

He was a member of the Church of Jesus Christ of Latter-day Saints. In 1924, Stoddard married Jennie Creer in the Salt Lake Temple of The Church of Jesus Christ of Latter-day Saints.

Stoddard donated the money to build the Latter-day Saint Student Living Center, which contains a chapel and apartments, adjacent to Michigan State University.

Stoddard received the Lansing Chamber of Commerce Community Service Award in 1960.

After Stoddard's death, his son Stanford C. Stoddard took over Michigan National Bank.

References 
 Ancestral file entry on Stoddard
 Richard Douglass Poll.  Howard J. Stoddard, founder, Michigan National Bank (East Lansing: Michigan State University Press, 1980).
 Death Notice for Jennie Creer Stoddard on February 16th, 2000

1901 births
1971 deaths
20th-century American businesspeople
American Latter Day Saints
American bankers
Latter Day Saints from Michigan
Latter Day Saints from Oregon
People from Baker City, Oregon